The Ammer Valley Railway (Ammertalbahn) runs through the German state of Baden-Württemberg, connecting the university town of Tübingen with Herrenberg in the Böblingen district. It mostly runs through the valley of the Ammer river. The single-track, non-electrified, non-federally-owned railway is now owned by the Zweckverband ÖPNV im Ammertal (ZÖA), with operations carried out by DB Regio AG. In addition, individual services are operated by the Hohenzollerische Landesbahn (HzL), acting as a subcontractor for DB Regio.

History

The Herrenberg–Pfäffingen section was opened on 12 August 1909, while the Pfäffingen–Tübingen section was delayed to 1 May 1910, partly because the construction of the Schlossberg tunnel had not been completed. The swampy ground in the Ammer valley also had to be treated, with 13 metre long oak logs being driven into the ground to stabilise the track. Not least, a citizens' initiative had opposed the approach advocated by Tübingen mayor Hermann Haußer for the rail project. Scholars and artists saw their popular promenades along the streets endangered by the railway line. The dispute was known as the Tübinger Alleenstreit ("Tübingen allee dispute"). The Schwäbische Heimatbund ("Swabian homeland association") was founded in 1909 during this dispute. Its goal at the time was to prevent industrialisation destroying any more of the old than was really necessary.

Deutsche Bundesbahn discontinued passenger services between Entringen and Herrenberg on 25 September 1966. The Entringen–Gültstein section continued to be operated for freight traffic until 31 January 1998, while the Gültstein–Herrenberg section was abandoned and eventually dismantled in 1973. The section, however, was never legally shut down and it did not pass out of rail ownership.

On 26 July 1995, the Zweckverband ÖPNV im Ammertal ("municipal association for public transport in the Ammer valley", ZÖA) was established and bought the line from Deutsche Bahn in 1996. The 4.1 km-long section between Gültstein and Herrenberg was rebuilt enabling the line to be reactivated for passenger services over its full length on 1 August 1999. The single-track, non-electrified line was completely modernised and prepared for operations at up to 100 km/h. The stations of Tübingen West, Pfäffingen and Entringen are crossing stations with two platform tracks. Entringen is the station where services are scheduled to cross. In Herrenberg, the trains operate exclusively from platform 102, in Tübingen they operate from platforms 1, 2 or 13. The line is operated using direct traffic control (Zugleitbetrieb) with the train dispatcher located in the Tübingen signalbox. 

When the line was recommissioned, 700 passengers per day were expected. On average more than 7,000 passengers per day used the line in 2008. In 2013, more than 8,000 passengers per day were counted.

Operations

Services on the Ammer Valley Railway are operated with Regio-Shuttle (class 650.0, 650.1 and 650.3) DMUs by DB ZugBus Regionalverkehr Alb-Bodensee, a subsidiary of DB Regio AG. Individual services are also operated each day by Hohenzollerische Landesbahn. Services run every half hour from Monday to Friday and hourly on weekends. Additional trains run between Tübingen and Entringen instead of school buses. Uerdingen railbuses (class 796 or 996) were used on the line until 21 May 1999.

While the trains on the western part of the line always terminate in Herrenberg, services continue from Tübingen every hour to Wendlingen and from there every two hours to Plochingen. Furthermore, on weekdays there are eight direct services from Herrenberg via the Erms Valley Railway to Bad Urach.

There are no freight operations on the line any more.

The owner of the line is the Zweckverband ÖPNV im Ammertal, which is owned by the Böblingen district (20%) and Tübingen district (80%).

Planning 

For several years, there have been considerations due to increased ridership of establishing a tram-train network called the Regionalstadtbahn Neckar-Alb, which would include the Ammer Valley Railway.

In March 2016, the planning approval procedure was initiated for the electrification of the line between Tübingen and Herrenberg and the upgrading of two sections. The track in Unterjesingen would be doubled with a new track to the south of the existing track. The doubled section would start west of the Ammer bridges and terminate before Unterjesingen Mitte station. At Unterjesingen Sandäcker station a second 110-metre-long outdoor platform would be built on the new track. The track would also be doubled from the western end of the platform in Entringen to just past the Hartwald bridge; the second track would also be located on the south side of the existing line.

References

Sources

External links

 
 

Railway lines in Baden-Württemberg
Railway lines opened in 1909
1909 establishments in Germany
Böblingen (district)
Tübingen (district)